The Brainerd Dispatch is a daily morning newspaper published in Brainerd, Minnesota.  The newspaper was founded on December 22, 1881, and became a daily paper in 1883. In April 2004, the Dispatch became a morning paper. In July 2020, the publication switched to twice-a-week printing and delivery. The paper is owned by Forum Communications. The paper is published by Pete Mohs.

History 
The paper was formerly owned by Stauffer Communications, which was acquired by Morris Communications in 1994. 

On December 26, 2013, Fargo, North Dakota based Forum Communications Company entered a deal with Morris to purchase several newspaper properties owned by Morris Communications including the Brainerd Dispatch. The deal was set to be finalized on January 1, 2014.

On July 16, 2020, the Brainerd Dispatch newspaper did not roll off its printing presses for the first time in 137 years but was instead available to readers in a digital format. 

The printed paper continued its delivery Wednesdays and Sundays in the early morning hours for paid subscribers. But on Mondays, Tuesdays, Thursdays and Fridays, its "e-paper" became the only way to view the publication's content, which still changes daily.

See also
 List of newspapers in Minnesota

References 

Publications established in 1881
Newspapers published in Minnesota
1881 establishments in Minnesota
Brainerd, Minnesota